Rubus caesius is a Eurasian species of dewberry, known as the European dewberry. Like other dewberries, it is a species of flowering plant in the rose family, related to the blackberry. It is widely distributed across much of Europe and Asia from Ireland and Portugal as far east as Xinjiang Province in western China.  It has also become sparingly naturalized in scattered locations in Argentina, Canada, and the United States.

Description

Rubus caesius is similar to and often confused with forms of Rubus fruticosus. It sends out long runners which root at the tip to form new plants. The stems are bluish-grey and sometimes prickly. The alternate leaves are hairy above and below. They are stalked and the leaf blades are palmate in shape, either consisting of three oval leaflets with serrated margins and acute points or just being three-lobed. The calyx has five sepals and the corolla is composed of five spreading petals with finely toothed margins. There is a boss of stamens in the centre and there are several pistils. The fruit is an aggregate of several black, fleshy drupes with a bluish waxy bloom. The dewberry flowers from June to September.

Distribution and habitat
Rubus caesius most often inhabits areas with rocky, basic soil and light shade. It is often found in forest margins, coppices, rocky broadleaf woods and waterside thickets. The Dewberry can hybridise with the raspberry (Rubus idaeus) and the stone bramble (Rubus saxatilis).

Hybrids
Various hybrids and cultivars have been developed from the wild form of R. caesius, including 'Youngberry' (a raspberries, blackberries, and dewberries hybrid), olallie blackberry and marionberry.

References

External links
 
 United States Department of Agriculture plants profile for Rubus caesius
 photo of herbarium specimen at Missouri Botanical Garden, collected near Mount Elbrus in the Caucasus in 1843

caesius
Plants described in 1753
Taxa named by Carl Linnaeus
Flora of Europe
Flora of Asia